Huanghe Science and Technology College (Chinese: 黄河科技学院; Pinyin: Huánghé Kējì Xuéyuàn) is a private four-year university located in Zhengzhou, Henan, People's Republic of China. Founded in October 1984, undergraduate education was implemented in 2000.

External links
 Official website of the College

Universities and colleges in Zhengzhou